Moving On is a British television anthology series, created and executively produced by Jimmy McGovern, which consists of a series standalone contemporary dramas, each focusing on a pivotal turning point in the life of one or more of the characters in the featured episode. The first episode, "The Rain Has Stopped", aired on 18 May 2009, and since, a total of 65 episodes have been broadcast.

Series overview

Episodes

Series 1 (2009)

Series 2 (2010)

Series 3 (2011)

Series 4 (2013)

Series 5 (2013)

Series 6 (2014)

Series 7 (2016)

Series 8 (2016)

Series 9 (2018)

Series 10 (2019)

Series 11 (2020)

Series 12 (2021)

References

External links
 

Moving On